The 2020 Big Ten women's soccer tournament was the postseason women's soccer tournament for the Big Ten Conference for the 2020 season. It was held from April 8 to April 18. As the tournament winner, Iowa earned the conference's automatic bid to the 2020 NCAA Division I Women's Soccer Tournament.

Effects of the COVID-19 pandemic 
The Big Ten tournament was originally set to be played in November 2020.  However, the Big Ten postponed fall sports with the hope of playing them in the spring.

Format 
The tournament consist of all 14 teams in the conference, instead of 8 as in previous years.

Rather than a straightforward 14-team tournament, there will be four "mini-tournaments" based on region and seeding. Two of the regionals will have four teams, and the other two, consisting of the two division winners, will have three. The four regional winners will advance to the main tournament, consisting of a semi-final round and the final, with each game hosted by the higher seed.

Regionals

East regional 1

Semifinals

Final

East regional 2

Semifinals

Final

West regional 1

Semifinals

Final

West regional 2

Semifinals

Final

Final tournament

Semifinals

Final

References 

2020 Big Ten Conference women's soccer season
Big Ten Women's Soccer Tournament